Capriole Goat Cheese is an artisan goat cheese producer in Greenville, Indiana. Founded in 1988, Capriole is one of the oldest and most award-winning goat cheese producers in the United States. ABC News called it a great U.S.. creamery. The Creamery is Owned by Judith Schad and is based on an 80-acre farmstead of rolling hills in Greenville, Indiana.

See also

 List of cheesemakers

References

Further reading
CAPRIOLE CHEVRE St. Louis Post-Dispatch Oct 25, 1999
610 Magnolia chef preparing brunch at Capriole Farm Courier - Journal - Aug 29, 2009

Cheesemakers
Dairy products companies of the United States
Food and drink companies based in Indiana